Fort Belknap Electric Cooperative, Inc. is a non-profit rural electric utility cooperative headquartered in Olney, Texas.

The Cooperative was organized in 1939 and serves portions of seven counties in the state of Texas, in a territory generally surrounding Olney and including its city limits. It maintains 2,143 miles of electric line and has 6,276 connected meters. 

Fort Belknap Electric is a member of the Brazos Electric Power Cooperative, a generation and transmission utility cooperative.

External links
Fort Belknap Electric Cooperative

1939 establishments in Texas
Companies based in Texas
Electric cooperatives in Texas
Archer County, Texas
Jack County, Texas
Palo Pinto County, Texas
Shackelford County, Texas
Stephens County, Texas
Throckmorton County, Texas
Young County, Texas